Sarah & Marc in Love was a German reality show following German pop singer Sarah Connor and her American former boy band member husband Marc Terenzi as they tried to set up their wedding ceremony.

Background
Sarah Connor and Marc Terenzi were both big stars in Germany when they met in 2003. Marc was a member of the boy band Natural at the time and Sarah was releasing her highly successful second album Unbelievable. At the time Marc's manager Lou Pearlman had wanted the relationship kept quiet but when Sarah became pregnant with their son in 2003 it could no longer be kept quiet. The two eloped and Sarah gave birth to their son Tyler in February 2004.

In Summer 2005 the couple participated in a reality show called Sarah and Marc in Love. The episodes were an hour long and in the style of other celebrity couple reality shows such as Newlyweds: Nick and Jessica. The show was mainly in German though there were parts in English with German subtitles (usually when the couple fought and Marc only spoke English.)

The episodes mainly revolved around planning the wedding and the hardships accompanying that though other episodes had different themes such as Marc recording his album, Sarah recording her part for Robots, and Sarah's German national anthem scandal. The finale was an extra long episode showing the day and night of the wedding. The couple was successfully remarried. Sarah's next single "Living to Love You" went to No. 1 and Marc's song "Love to be Loved by You" (which was his wedding present to Sarah and sung during the ceremony) went to No. 3.

A DVD of the series was released on 25 November 2005 in Germany.

Cast
 Sarah Connor
 Marc Terenzi
 Tyler (son)
 Frank (wedding planner)
 Soraya (Sarah's mother)
 Michael Leve (Sarah's father)
 Sophia Luisa (Sarah's sister)
 Valentina (Sarah's sister)
 Marisa (Sarah's sister)
 Anna Maria (Sarah's sister)
 Robin (Sarah's brother)
 Mike (Marc's cousin)

Episodes
 Aller Anfang ist schwer (Every Beginning Is Hard)
 Memories
 Wasserspiele (Playing in Water)
 Allianz-Arena
 Knock out
 Relax, Sarah
 Ich mach dich "fresh" (I'll Make You "Fresh")
 Sarah in Sorge (Sarah in Trouble)
 Man muss auch mal NEIN sagen können (Sometimes One Must Be Able to Say NO)
 Ein Indianer kennt keinen Schmerz (An Indian Does Not Know Pain)
 Wer ist der Killer? (Who Is the Killer?)
 Wild, Wild West
 Ich sehe was, was du nicht siehst (I Spy with My Little Eye)
 Die Party des Jahres (The Party of the Year)

External links
 ProSieben site
 

German reality television series
ProSieben original programming
Sarah Connor (singer)
2005 German television series debuts
2005 German television series endings
German-language television shows